Shine Through the Stars is the first full-length studio album by Christian rock band Chasen, released on April 15, 2008. Two singles have been released off the album; "Crazy Beautiful" and "Drown". The first single "Crazy Beautiful" reached No. 1 on CRW's Christian Contemporary Hit Radio (CHR) chart, as well as the top 10 on R&R’s CHR chart.

Track listing
"If It Comes Down" – 3:36
"Crazy Beautiful" – 2:47
"Nothing Like You" – 2:36
"Drown" – 3:56
"Doubts or Disbelief" – 3:59
"All Creation" – 4:08
"History Tonight" – 4:00
"All I Can Say" – 3:01
"God & King" – 4:18
"Desires" – 3:35
"You and I" – 3:22
"Don't Walk Away" – 3:27
"Stars Are Meant to Shine" – 8:30

References

2008 albums
Chasen (band) albums